Lady Slipper Brook is a running body of water in the Canadian Province of Newfoundland and Labrador.

References

Rivers of Newfoundland and Labrador